Gabrovo is a town in Gabrovo Province, Bulgaria.

Gabrovo can also refer to:

Bulgaria 
Gabrovo, Blagoevgrad Province, village in Blagoevgrad Municipality, Blagoevgrad Province, Bulgaria
Gabrovo, Kardzhali Province, village in Chernoochene Municipality, Kardzhali Province, Bulgaria
Gabrovo Municipality, in Gabrovo Province, Bulgaria
Gabrovo Province, Bulgaria

North Macedonia 
Gabrovo, Delčevo, village in the municipality of Delčevo, North Macedonia
Gabrovo, Novo Selo, village in the municipality of Novo Selo, North Macedonia

Slovenia 
Gabrovo, Škofja Loka, village in the Municipality of Škofja Loka, Upper Carniola region, Slovenia

Southern Ocean 
Gabrovo Knoll, peak in the Friesland Ridge, Tangra Mountains, Livingston Island